San Luis Airport may refer to:

 San Luis Airport (Argentina) or Brigadier Mayor César Raúl Ojeda Airport in San Luis, Argentina
 San Luis Airport (Colombia) in Ipiales, Colombia
 San Luis Obispo County Regional Airport in San Luis Obispo, California, United States
 San Luis Río Colorado Airport, in San Luis Río Colorado, Mexico